The Timor Leste Cycling, formerly East Timor Cycling Federation, is the national governing body of cycle racing in Timor Leste.

The Federation is a member of the UCI and the ACC.

References

National members of the Asian Cycling Confederation
Cycle racing organizations
Cycle racing in East Timor
Cycling